Flammersfeld is a municipality in the district of Altenkirchen, in Rhineland-Palatinate, Germany. It is situated in the Westerwald, approx. 35 km north of Koblenz.

Flammersfeld was the seat of the former Verbandsgemeinde ("collective municipality") Flammersfeld.

People from the village 
 Andreas Balzar (known as Balzar of Flammersfeld, 1769–1797) poacher, robber and Freischärler who fought the French
 Emil Bettgenhäuser (1906–1982), politician (SPD), MdB, MdL Rhineland-Palatinate
 W. Gies (born 1945), fine art
 Emil Müller (1890–1967), politician (SPD), MdL Rhineland-Palatinate, Bürgermeister of Flammersfeld
 Friedrich Wilhelm Raiffeisen (1818-1888), mayor in 1848, early founder of credit unions and cooperatives

References

Altenkirchen (district)